Telve (Télve in local dialect) is a comune (municipality) in Trentino in the northern Italian region Trentino-Alto Adige/Südtirol, located about  east of Trento.

Telve borders the following municipalities: Castello-Molina di Fiemme, Valfloriana, Pieve Tesino, Scurelle, Baselga di Pinè, Palù del Fersina, Telve di Sopra, Carzano, Borgo Valsugana and Castelnuovo.

Demographic evolution

References

External links
 Homepage of the city

Cities and towns in Trentino-Alto Adige/Südtirol